Sarah Trowbridge (born September 27, 1982, Washington, DC) is an American rower. She began rowing in high school in Guilford, Connecticut and won two Big 10 championships at the University of Michigan. She joined the U.S. national team in 2008. She qualified for the 2012 Summer Olympics in the women's double sculls with partner Margot Shumway. They finished 6th in the finals.

In August 2017, she was named head coach of the women’s rowing team at the University of San Diego.

Trowbridge graduated in 2006 from the University of Michigan with a degree in English.

References

Sarah Trowbridge, USRowing 
Sarah Trowbridge, NBC Connecticut

University of Michigan College of Literature, Science, and the Arts alumni
1982 births
Living people
American female rowers
Olympic rowers of the United States
Rowers at the 2012 Summer Olympics
People from Washington, D.C.
Pan American Games medalists in rowing
Pan American Games gold medalists for the United States
Pan American Games silver medalists for the United States
World Rowing Championships medalists for the United States
Rowers at the 2007 Pan American Games
San Diego Toreros coaches
Medalists at the 2007 Pan American Games
21st-century American women